Spar boxes are a type of folk art, crafted by miners to display minerals and crystals they have found.

External links
 The Story of Spar Boxes
 NATIONAL SPAR BOX COLLECTION TO SHOW OFF MINING HERITAGE AT KILLHOPE
 The Spar Box

Folk art